Ante Sarić (born 17 June 1992) is a Croatian professional footballer who plays as a defender.

External links

1992 births
Living people
Sportspeople from Zadar
Association football defenders
Croatian footballers
Croatia youth international footballers
NK Zadar players
FC Politehnica Iași (2010) players
NK Metalleghe-BSI players
Croatian Football League players
Liga I players
Premier League of Bosnia and Herzegovina players
First Football League (Croatia) players
Expatriate footballers in Romania
Croatian expatriate sportspeople in Romania
Expatriate footballers in Bosnia and Herzegovina
Croatian expatriate sportspeople in Bosnia and Herzegovina